The 2000 Lithuanian Athletics Championships were held at the S. Darius and S. Girėnas Stadium in Kaunas on August 3 and August 4, 2000.

Men

Women

Medals by city

External links
 Lithuanian athletics

Lithuanian Athletics Championships
Lithuanian Athletics Championships, 2000
Lithuanian Athletics Championships